Napoleon High School is a public high school in Napoleon, Ohio. It is the only high school in the Napoleon Area City School District. Their nickname is the Wildcats. They are a member of the Northern Lakes League.

Academics
The Napoleon school district once held an "Excellent" rating from the old report card of the Ohio Department of Education, which was used prior to 2015, including an "Excellent with Distinction" rating for the high school.

Band
Director: Andrew Lesick

The school houses 4 bands at Napoleon High School. The Marching Band, Symphonic Band, Jazz Band, and Pep Band. The Marching Band entertains during the halftime of every football game. The Symphonic band has three concerts each year. The Jazz Band specializes in Swing, Latin, and other more difficult forms of music. They play at each concert and also at special events. The Pep band entertains the basketball crowd at each home basketball game.

Clubs
Drama/Thespian Society, 
Spanish Club, 
PAWS, 
French Club, 
Roar, 
National Honor Society, 
Exchange Students, 
Speech Team, 
Quiz Team,
Jazz Choir,
Envirothon, 
DECA, 
HI-OY, and 
Student Council

History of the Wildcats
By: David Addington

Through the early 1930s, the Napoleon High School athletic teams were known as the “Little Corporals.” Then, when Scotty Florence took over as coach in the fall of 1937, the Napoleon teams became unofficially known as the “Fighting Scots” or “Scots.” In the late summer of 1940, Napoleon put together a search committee to select a new name or mascot for NHS athletic teams. Cliff Nelson, who had been coach at Swanton, came to Napoleon to guide the football squad that fall. The search lasted three weeks and the committee voted 4–2 to accept the nomination of “Wildcats” submitted by Dick Speiser. He was awarded the $3 prize. Coaches in the 1930s included Carl Adams, Rex Burke, and John Cuff. Florence then was the coach for three years before being replaced by Cliff Nelson. After three more seasons, Nelson gave way to Joe Ayers. However, Nelson returned to coach Napoleon's son of the gridiron through 1946–47. Then in the fall of 1948, a young, handsome Swanton native by way of BGSU and in the U.S. paratroopers who fought in the Battle of the Bulge, Charlie Buckenmeyer, would come on to become a living legend. From 1948 through 1977, with time out for another stint in the U.S. Army (1951) Bucky became only the second man to rule the Great Maumee Valley, the other being General Anthony Wayne. Buckenmeyer and the Wildcats become synonymous with football excellence. In 29 seasons, Napoleon won 209 games and 17 times the wildcats were unbeaten or lost just once. During the span, Napoleon won 18 Northwest Ohio Athletic League championships Since 1977, Napoleon has seen five men guide the Wildcat grid fortunes... Don Morrison, Hip Klotz, Lynn Schrickel, Mike Burke, John Snoad, and now Tory Strock.Women's soccer and basketball teams led by 4-year stud Bethany Blackwood, NAIA All-American at Grace College. Certified stud.

Athletics

Ohio High School Athletic Association State Championships

 Boys Basketball – 1981 
 Boys Cross Country – 2000 
 Girls Basketball — 2021 
 Girls Cross Country – 2003

Other athletic accomplishments
 Boys Water Polo* state champions - 1980, 1983, 1984, 1991 
 Girls Water Polo* state champions - 1996, 1997, 1998, 1999, 2017 
 * Sponsored by Ohio High School Swim Coaches' Association.
  Boys Diving State Champions - 2007

Northern Lakes League championships (2011-)
Boys Basketball: 2012
Boys Swimming: 2012, 2013, 2014, 2015
Football: 2012
Wrestling: 2018

Greater Buckeye Conference championships (2003-2011)
Baseball: 2011
Boys Soccer: 2003, 2005*
Boys Swimming: 2003, 2004, 2005, 2006, 2007, 2008, 2009, 2010, 2011
Football: 2004*, 2007, 2009*
Softball: 2006, 2007, 2008

Great Lakes League championships (1978-1997, 2002-2003)
Football: 1981*

NWOAL championships (1926-1978)
Football: 1926, 1927, 1929, 1941*, 1947, 1949, 1951*, 1955, 1956*, 1957, 1958, 1960, 1961, 1963, 1965*, 1966, 1967, 1969*, 1970, 1971, 1972, 1973, 1975, 1976
Boys Cross Country: 1969, 1970, 1971
Golf: 1956, 1957, 1958, 1959, 1961, 1965, 1966, 1968, 1969, 1970, 1971, 1972, 1975, 1977
Boys Basketball: 1926–27, 1927–28, 1931–32, 1937-38*, 1947–48, 1952–53, 1959–60, 1960–61, 1961-62*, 1962–63, 1963-64*, 1969–70, 1970–71, 1971–72, 1972-73
Wrestling: 1960–61, 1961–62, 1962–63, 1963–64, 1965–66, 1966–67, 1967–68, 1968–69, 1969–70, 1971–72, 1972–73, 1975-76*
Baseball: 1963, 1967*, 1970*, 1971*, 1972*, 1974*, 1978
Boys Track & Field: 1928, 1929, 1949, 1950, 1952, 1956, 1960, 1962, 1964, 1966*, 1967, 1968, 1969, 1971, 1972, 1976, 1977
Girls Track & Field: 1972, 1977, 1978, 2013

Note: shared league titles are denoted with an asterisk (*)

References

External links
 District Website
Napoleon replaces Rossford in NLL

High schools in Henry County, Ohio
Public high schools in Ohio